Negramaro is an Italian pop band formed in 1999 and successful since 2005. Their name stems from Negroamaro, a wine produced in their native district, Salento in Apulia.

After years spent in the Italian alternative market, they finally became known more widely in 2005 thanks to the Festival di Sanremo.

Members
Giuliano Sangiorgi (Nardò, LE, 24 January 1979) (vocals, guitar and piano)
Emanuele Spedicato (Nardò, LE, 26 October 1980) (guitar)
Ermanno Carlà (Veglie, LE, 17 February 1977) (bass)
Danilo Tasco (Gagliano del Capo, LE, 26 March 1979) (drums)
Andrea "Andro.i.d." Mariano (Copertino, LE, 26 March 1978) (piano and synthesizer)
Andrea "Pupillo" De Rocco (Nardò, LE, 30 September 1973) (sampler)

Biography

Debut and Negramaro
Negramaro formed in 1999 in Copertino, near Lecce. In the beginning, helped by live performances, they received good reviews. That improved when they met producer Caterina Caselli, who taught them how to record music. 

In 2001 they won the Tim Tour and ended as finalists at the MTV Brand New Talent.

Their first album, Negramaro, was released in 2003. The sound of the album was too alternative for the Italian public, so it did not have much success. Two singles were released. They were minor hits: "Mono" and "Solo".

The 000577 Project
In 2004, Negramaro met Italian producer Corrado Rustici to work on a few songs. The collaboration between them spawned a brand new track, "Scusa Se Non Piango", and three remixes of previous songs: "Es-Senza", "Evidentemente" and "Come Sempre". The four tracks were added to the other songs from their first album to create 000577, a new edition of their debut work.

This new edition gave the band a more pop-rock feeling, which was more suitable for the Italian public. The 2004 version of "Come Sempre" was released as a single with better success of the previous ones, and was even chosen as the soundtrack to celebrate the 50th birthday of the Italian TV network RAI.

Mentre Tutto Scorre: Commercial success
Negramaro performed the song "Mentre Tutto Scorre" at the Sanremo Festival in 2005, but were eliminated at the first turn. The song was the first single released from their eponymous second album.

After the festival, eight of their songs were chosen as the soundtrack of the Italian film La Febbre, starring Fabio Volo.

This helped the band to launch their success: despite the Sanremo disappointment, the single "Mentre Tutto Scorre" was a success. The second single, "Estate", was even more successful, giving the band their first #1 in the Italian airplay chart. "Solo3min" and "Nuvole e Lenzuola" followed the success of the first two singles.

Thanks to hit singles, good performances and critics, their album Mentre Tutto Scorre gained a lot of success, being certified 6× platinum in Italy.

This album was different from the first one: it was entirely produced by Corrado Rustici, and took the band in a pop rock direction rather than their classic alternative style. Their change gave them success through radio, music marketing and fans.

The album was accompanied by a tour later released on the Negramaro Live DVD in 2006.

Their single "Nuvole e Lenzuola" is included in the game Guitar Hero World Tour.

Their fifth studio album Casa 69 was recorded at Metalworks Studios in Mississauga, Ontario.

Their sixth studio album La rivoluzione sta arrivando was released on 25 September 2015.

Discography

Albums

Singles

Filmography
 2007 – Dall'altra parte della luna (documentary, directed by Dario Baldi e Davide Marengo)
 2019 – L'anima vista da qui (documentary, directed by Gianluca Grandinetti)

References

External links
Official website

Italian pop music groups
Musical groups established in 1999
Nastro d'Argento winners
MTV Europe Music Award winners
1999 establishments in Italy
Musical groups from Apulia